The Chronological Table of Local Legislation or the Chronological Table of Local Acts is a list of local Acts passed by the Parliament of Great Britain and the Parliament of the United Kingdom since 1797.

It was produced by the Law Commission and the Scottish Law Commission who produced a report on it.

A writer in the Law Librarian said that the Chronological Table of Local Legislation was a "monumental work".

References

External links
Chronological Table of Local Acts from Legislation.gov.uk.

Legal literature